Documentary Educational Resources (DER) is a US non-profit producer and distributor of film and video in anthropology and ethnology.

It was founded in 1968 by independent filmmakers John Marshall and Timothy Asch and is based in Watertown, Massachusetts.  Its mission is "to promote thought-provoking documentary film and media for learning about the people and cultures of the world.".

References

External links 
 Official website of Documentary Educational Resources
 Record for DER at intute.ac.uk
 IMDB record for Documentary Educational Resources

Film distributors of the United States
Visual anthropology
Documentary film organizations
Organizations based in Massachusetts